The Buena Vista Correctional Facility is a state prison for men located in Buena Vista, Chaffee County, Colorado, owned and operated by the Colorado Department of Corrections.  The facility opened as an adult prison in 1978, and houses 871 inmates at medium and close security levels, along with the 288-inmate Buena Vista Minimum Center, and another 100 minimum security inmates within the Colorado Correctional Alternative Program ("Boot Camp"). The Boot Camp is closed today. The close security facility is known to inmates as "The Buildings" and the Minimum is known as "The Mods". The prison is split into 6 Housing units A&O which is an Orientation unit that inmates are placed in when they first arrive to the prison. Segregation is the unit where inmates are placed for disciplinary actions, North Unit, Lower North Unit, East Unit and South Unit which houses the majority of the prisons active gang members and violent offenders. In the late 90s and Early 2000s "The Buildings was referred to as "Gladiator School" because most of Colorado's younger gang members were sent there. During that time the fighting and violence was at a record High in the State. 

The site was first founded in 1892 as the Colorado State Reformatory for juvenile offenders, making it the second oldest prison in the state, after the Colorado Territorial Correctional Facility.

References

Prisons in Colorado
Buildings and structures in Chaffee County, Colorado
1892 establishments in Colorado